James McKay may refer to:

 James McKay (Canadian politician) (1862–1931), Canadian Member of Parliament
 James McKay (fur trader) (1828–1879), Canadian fur trader, interpreter, and politician
 James Iver McKay (1793–1853), United States Representative from North Carolina
 James Wilson McKay (1912–1992), Scottish freemason, Lord Provost of Edinburgh
 James McKay (industrialist) (1830–1906), Pittsburgh industrialist and founder of James McKay & Co chain manufacturers
 James McKay Sr. (1808–1876), mayor of Tampa, Florida
 James McKay (New Brunswick politician) (1836–1916), farmer and political figure in New Brunswick, Canada
 James Russell McKay (1889–1966), American football player
 James C. McKay (1917–2015), American trial lawyer

See also 
Jim McKay (1921–2008), American journalist
Jim McKay (director), American film and television director, producer and writer
Jim McKay (footballer) (1918–1986), Scottish footballer
James MacKay (disambiguation)
James Mackey (disambiguation)
James Mackie (disambiguation)